Pinna nobilis, whose common name is the noble pen shell or fan mussel, is a large species of Mediterranean clam, a marine bivalve mollusc in the family Pinnidae, the pen shells. 

It produces a rare manganese-containing porphyrin protein known as pinnaglobin.

Description
 

Its shape differs depending on the region it inhabits. Like all pen shells, it is relatively fragile to pollution and shell damage. It attaches itself to rocks using a strong byssus composed of many silk-like threads which used to be made into cloth. The inside of the shell is lined with brilliant mother-of-pearl.

As with other members of its genus, Pinna nobilis hosts symbiotic shrimp which live inside its shell. It is believed that when it sees a threat, the shrimp warns the host, perhaps by retracting its claws or even by pinching. The clam then closes shut. It has been demonstrated that the shrimp has a similar filter-feeding diet to its host and the relationship is likely mutualistic.

Distribution
It could be found buried beneath soft-sediment areas (fine sand, mud, often anoxic).

Human relevance
This species is the origin of sea silk, which was made from the byssus of the animal.

Threats 
In 2016, there was an outbreak of a disease that caused the mortality of 99% of its population in Spain. The cause of the disease is a newly discovered pathogen, Haplosporidium pinnae and it is posing a serious threat to the survival of the species. By 2019, mortality spots had been detected in Greece, Croatia, Turkey, Tunisia, France and Morocco. In the Trieste area, considerable efforts have also been made to conserve the deposits since 2020. In the past, Pinna nobilis has been threatened with extinction, due in part to fishing, incidental killing by trawling and anchoring, and the decline in seagrass fields; pollution kills eggs, larvae, and adult mussels. Such threats, however, have been very localised and have not led to such a widespread and rapid population decline. The pathogen, which is still present in the environment, will make recovery a challenge, so continuing declines are expected. The percentage of population size reduction over the last ten years is over 80%. In December 2019, Pinna nobilis has entered the IUCN Red List as critically endangered.

The noble pen shell has been listed as an endangered species in the Mediterranean Sea. The European Council Habitats Directive 92/43/EEC, on conservation of natural habitats and the wild fauna and flora, proclaims that P. nobilis is strictly protected (by the Annex IV of EEC, 1992) – all forms of deliberate capture or killing of fan mussel specimens are prohibited by law.

As part of the Costa Concordia disaster recovery effort in Italy in 2012, a group of about 200 Pinna nobilis was relocated to a nearby area due to the threat posed by subsequent engineering work.

Gallery

See also
List of animals that produce silk

References

Further reading
 Hill, John E. 2004. The Peoples of the West. A draft annotated translation of the 3rd century Weilüe – see Section 12 of the text and Appendix D.
Laufer, Berthold. 1915. "The Story of the Pinna and the Syrian Lamb", The Journal of American Folk-lore 28.108:103–128.
 McKinley, Daniel L. 1988. "Pinna and Her Silken Beard: A Foray Into Historical Misappropriations". Ars Textrina: A Journal of Textiles and Costumes, Vol. Twenty-nine, June 1998, Winnipeg, Canada. pp. 9–223.
 Maeder, Felicitas 2002. "The project Sea-silk – Rediscovering an Ancient Textile Material." Archaeological Textiles Newsletter, Number 35, Autumn 2002, pp. 8–11.
 Maeder, Felicitas, Hänggi, Ambros and Wunderlin, Dominik, Eds. 2004. Bisso marino : Fili d’oro dal fondo del mare – Muschelseide : Goldene Fäden vom Meeresgrund. Naturhistoriches Museum and Museum der Kulturen, Basel, Switzerland. (In Italian and German).
Schafer, Edward H. 1967. The Vermillion Bird: T'ang Images of the South. University of California Press.
 Turner, Ruth D. and Rosewater, Joseph 1958. "The Family Pinnidae in the Western Atlantic" Johnsonia, Vol. 3 No. 38, 28 June 1958, pp. 285–326.
 R. Tucker Abbott & S. Peter Dance, 1982, “Compendium of seashells: a color guide to more than 4,200 of the world’s marine shells”, E.P. Dutton Inc., New York. .

External links

 Images of shells
 

Pinnidae
Molluscs described in 1758
Taxa named by Carl Linnaeus